Upton railway station serves the village of Upton and the Noctorum area of Birkenhead, on the Wirral Peninsula, England. The station is situated on the Borderlands line. Transport for Wales operates the station and all trains serving it.

History
Upton Station was opened to passengers on 18 May 1896, as part of the Dee and Birkenhead Railway. The station became part of the North Wales and Liverpool Railway, less than three months later, on 7 July 1896.

The station had a booking office on the road bridge which spans the two platforms. Staffing ended on 20 April 1969, with the booking office removed during redevelopment of the station and expansion of the road bridge in the 1970s. The station had a brick-built waiting room situated on each platform.

Freight and goods
Adjacent to the station there was a coal and goods yard with a cattle pen. From 1 February 1965, the goods yard only handled coal, and closed on 28 April 1969. The site of the goods yard now has a Co-operative supermarket. Access to the yard was operated by a small signal box with a 24-lever frame, which was used until 25 June 1969. The signal box was situated at the southern end of the Bidston-bound platform.

Iron ore freight trains also passed through the station. These freight trains operated from Bidston Dock to the John Summers steelworks in Shotton. The Class 9F locomotive 92203, later named as Black Prince, worked the final steam-hauled iron ore train in November 1967. The freight service itself ended around 1980.

Future
Proposals have been put forward to electrify the track as part of the proposed Borderlands line electrification scheme. Merseyrail would like to see the line electrified and incorporated into the Wirral line to link with its own third-rail service, with a doubling of the frequency of services. This would allow the station to serve as a part of a direct service to Liverpool.

Transport for Wales have an Adopt a Station initiative. Upton station is on their list of adopted stations and has been adopted by a member, or members, of the public.

In June 2018 it was announced that, as part of the new KeolisAmey operation of the Wales & Borders franchise, the frequency of trains on the line would increase to 2tph from December 2022. It is expected to be increased by December 2021, but is currently experiencing delays were caused by the COVID-19 pandemic.

Facilities
The station facilities are somewhat rudimentary. Although longer, each platform is surfaced to receive four carriages only. The station is unstaffed at nearly all times, but has platform CCTV. Each of the two platforms has a waiting shelter with seating. There is no payphone or booking office, but there are electronic departure and arrival screens for live information to passengers. There is no official station car park, but very limited parking outside the station, at the drop-off point, on the old Ford Road bridge. Wheelchair and pram access to each of the two platforms is possible, and relatively easy, via the ramp-staircases. Though, as yet, platform access has not been modernised to the standard of that at Hooton.

Services

From Monday to Saturday, there is an hourly service between Bidston and Wrexham Central (two-hourly in the evening and on Bank Holidays). There is a service every 90 minutes each way on Sundays. Services are timed according to a Class 153 Super Sprinter DMU, although usually provided by a Transport for Wales Class 150/2 Sprinter DMU.

References

Bibliography

External links

 The railway in Upton, including various historical photographic images, courtesy of Upton.cx

Upton Station is on the list of stations adopted as part of the Adopt a Station initiative of Transport for Wales.

Railway stations in the Metropolitan Borough of Wirral
DfT Category F2 stations
Former Great Central Railway stations
Railway stations in Great Britain opened in 1896
Railway stations served by Transport for Wales Rail